is a passenger railway station located in the city of Yoshikawa, Saitama, Japan, operated by the East Japan Railway Company (JR East). It opened on 17 March 2012.

Lines

Station layout
The station consists of one island platform and one side platform serving a total of three tracks. The platforms are long enough to accommodate 8-car trains. The station is staffed.

Platforms

History

Construction work started in November 2009. On 27 January 2010, the new name for the station was formally chosen from three proposed names selected from 131 original proposals: Yoshikawa Namazu-no-sato, Yoshikawa-Minami, and Musashi-Yoshikawa. The station opened on 17 March 2012.

Construction cost
The total cost of construction for the new station is estimated to be 7.168 billion yen, with JR East paying 2.808 billion yen, and Yoshikawa City paying 4.36 billion yen.

Passenger statistics
JR East forecast that the station would be used by an average of 23,000 passengers daily within five years of its opening. In fiscal 2019, the station was used by an average of 5,523 passengers daily (boarding passengers only).

Surrounding area
 Minami Chuo Park
 Yoshikawa High School

See also
 List of railway stations in Japan

References

External links

 Yoshikawaminami Station information (JR East) 
 Yoshikawa City information on New Station 

Railway stations in Japan opened in 2012
Stations of East Japan Railway Company
Railway stations in Saitama Prefecture
Musashino Line
Yoshikawa, Saitama